WFBO-LP (97.7 FM, "Oldies 97.7 The Blizzard") was a low-power FM radio station in Flagler County, Florida, with their last studio location at 819 North A1A Suite B in Flagler Beach, Florida. The antenna and transmitter were located on and in the Aliki Condo 1601 North Central Ave. and never relocated. This was also the location of the studio when the station first went on air.

In 2004, the station relocated to the second floor of Century 21 A1A, 1399 North Oceanshore Blvd., on A1A in Flagler Beach. Then in February 2006, the studio moved to 819 North A1A Suite B in the Prudential Real Estate building in Flagler Beach. Due to the real estate company moving offices, the studio moved to European Village Resort, 101 Palm Harbor Parkway, Palm Coast, in September 2006, before it went back to 819 North A1A Suite B in 2007, till its demise and it relinquished its broadcast license to the Federal Communications Commission in November 2008, in lieu on not having to pay its second fine of $8,000 to the F.C.C. 
The station moved from 93.3 to 97.7 MHz on April 28, 2008, to have a better signal output due to interference from high power stations on 93.3 in Tampa and Jacksonville. The station was licensed to Halifax Christian Community Church Inc. The station also had a webcast on Live 365.com, accessible through the station's website.

K.P. Manning was "The Blizzard" General Manager and did the morning show since the start of the station in September 2002 until July 2006.

Ronald L. Kocher started WFBO-LP and was President, CEO, and Chief Engineer responsible for all legal actions.

References

See: 

for FCC fine information.

External links
 

FBO-LP
Radio stations established in 2002
FBO-LP
Oldies radio stations in the United States
Flagler County, Florida
2002 establishments in Florida
Defunct radio stations in the United States
2008 disestablishments in Florida
Radio stations disestablished in 2008
FBO-LP